Az obsitos (The Soldier on Leave) is an operetta by Emmerich Kálmán. It has been performed under many different names.

Performance history and versions
The first version, in Hungarian, with a libretto by Károly von Bakonyi, premiered at the Vígszínház, Budapest, on 16 March 1910.

The second, German version,  (The good comrade), with a libretto revised by Viktor Léon, premiered at the Bürgertheater, Vienna, on 10 October 1911. The location of the operetta was changed from Hungary to Austria.

The third, more nationalistic, version,  (I Gave Gold for Iron) was premiered at the Theater an der Wien on 16 October 1914. This was adapted, with additional music by Sigmund Romberg and words by Rida Johnson Young, as Her Soldier Boy which was produced on Broadway, at the Astor Theatre, from 6 December 1916 to 26 May 1917, and as Soldier Boy at the Apollo Theatre, Shaftesbury Avenue, Westminster, in 1918.

A version produced by Ohio Light Opera in Wooster, Ohio, 2005 was called A Soldier's Promise. It was recorded as a DVD.

Roles

Synopsis
Karoline and her daughter Marlene do not know that their long-absent son and brother Franz has been killed in the war. Franz's soldier friend Alwin goes to tell them the news, but in the event, he can't bring himself to tell them the truth and introduces himself as Alwin, whom they haven’t seen in many years. But things grow difficult when Alwin finds himself falling in love with his “sister”.

References 

Lamb, Andrew (1992), "Kálmán, Emmerich" in The New Grove Dictionary of Opera, ed. Stanley Sadie (London)

External links
 Josef Weinberger page on Der gute Kamerad, accessed 20 November 2010
 IBDB page on Her Soldier Boy, accessed 20 November 2010
 
 "Mirth and Melody in Her Soldier Boy, review in The New York Times, 7 December 1916, accessed 20 November 2010

Operas by Emmerich Kálmán
German-language operettas
Hungarian-language operettas
1910 operas
1911 operas
1914 operas